Vladimir A. Tkachyov (born 5 October 1993) is a Russian professional ice hockey forward for Traktor Chelyabinsk of the Kontinental Hockey League (KHL).

Playing career
Tkachyov made his KHL debut playing with Ak Bars Kazan during the 2012–13 KHL season. After posting career bests with 15 goals and 32 points with Kazan in the 2016–17 season, Tkachyov warded off NHL interest in agreeing to a new two-year contract extension to continue with the club on May 3, 2017.

Following his second season with Lokomotiv Yaroslavl in 2020–21, having served as team captain and collected 10 goals and 28 points through 53 regular season games, Tkachyov left the club as a free agent.

On 3 May 2021, Tkachyov was signed to a two-year contract with his third KHL club, Traktor Chelyabinsk.

International play

Tkachyov originally was selected as a reserve player for the 2022 Olympics, however, on 26 January 2022, when Artem Anisimov was tested positive with Covid-19, Tkachyov was advanced to the selection.

Career statistics

Regular season and playoffs

International

Awards and honours

References

External links

1993 births
Living people
Ak Bars Kazan players
JHC Bars players
Lokomotiv Yaroslavl players
Russian ice hockey centres
Sportspeople from Dnipro
Traktor Chelyabinsk players
Ukrainian ice hockey centres
Ice hockey players at the 2022 Winter Olympics
Medalists at the 2022 Winter Olympics
Olympic silver medalists for the Russian Olympic Committee athletes
Olympic medalists in ice hockey
Olympic ice hockey players of Russia